Walnut Hills Cemetery is a historic cemetery on Grove Street and Allandale Road in Brookline, Massachusetts.  It encompasses , with mature trees and puddingstone outcrops, and was laid out in 1875 in the then-fashionable rural cemetery style.  Many past prominent citizens of the town, including architect H.H. Richardson, are buried here.  The cemetery was listed on the National Register of Historic Places in 1985.

Description and history
Walnut Hills Cemetery is located in southern Brookline, south of the junction of Grove Street and Allandale Road. Its main entrance is at that junction, with a secondary entrance a short way to the west on Grove Street. It is flanked on the south and west sides by residential areas. Paved and unpaved roads and paths wind through the cemetery, following the contours of the terrain.

The cemetery's built features include its receiving tomb, built in 1901 to a design by Alexander Wadsworth Longfellow, Jr.  The cluster of utility buildings, including a stable and shed, were designed by Guy Lowell (who is interred here) and built in 1901; Lowell is also the likely designer of the superintendent's cottage that stands near the secondary entrance.

The town retained two landscape gardners, Ernest Bowditch and Franklin Copeland, to oversee its layout. Most of the design for its network of lanes and paths is credited to Bowditch. The first parts of the cemetery to be filled have mostly granite headstones, often with symbolic figures. In 1886, the cemetery laid down strict new rules, requiring use of slate and enforcing dimensional restrictions. These rules were later relaxed to allow for the use of dark Quincy granite, and then other forms of granite.

Several individuals of local and national importance are buried here.  H.H. Richardson, an architect of national stature and a Brookline resident, is buried here, as is Guy Lowell.  Charles Sprague Sargent, another Brookline resident buried here, was the founder and first leader of Boston's Arnold Arboretum.  John Charles Olmsted, the son of noted landscape architect Frederick Law Olmsted and a noted landscape architect in his own right, is buried here.

See also
National Register of Historic Places listings in Brookline, Massachusetts

References

External links 
 Town of Brookline - Walnut Hills Cemetery
 findagrave Walnut Hills Cemetery

Cemeteries on the National Register of Historic Places in Massachusetts
1875 establishments in Massachusetts
Buildings and structures in Brookline, Massachusetts
Cemeteries in Norfolk County, Massachusetts
National Register of Historic Places in Brookline, Massachusetts
Rural cemeteries
Cemeteries established in the 1870s